Tim Krohn (born 9 February 1965) is an author of Swiss literature, recipient of the 1994 Conrad-Ferdinand-Meyer-Preis.

Born in Wiedenbrück, North Rhine-Westphalia, Krohn grew up in Glarus. He interrupted his studies of German language, Philosophy and Politology in 1992 and has been working as a freelance author based in Zürich.

Works:
1990, Fäustchen
1992, Surfer / Zeitalter des Esels
1994, Der Schwan in Stücken
1996, Die kleine Oper vom Herbstmondfächer
1997, Dreigroschenkabinett
1998, Quatemberkinder
2000, Irinas Buch der leichtfertigen Liebe
2002, Bienen, Königinnen, Schwäne in Stücken
2002, Die Erfindung der Welt, with Elisa Ortega
2005, Heimweh
2007, Vrenelis Gärtli
2008, Warum die Erde Rund ist
2008, Schneewittchen
2009, Platons Höhle
2009, Ans Meer

References

External links
 Website Tim Krohn
 Tim Krohn in: NRW Literatur im Netz

See also
Alemannic literature

1965 births
Living people
Swiss male novelists
20th-century Swiss novelists
21st-century Swiss novelists
20th-century male writers
21st-century male writers